Shinḍanḍ District is located in the southern part of Herat Province in Afghanistan, bordering Adraskan District to the north, Ghor Province to the east and Farah Province to the south and west. It is one of the 16 districts of Herat Province. The name Shindand is Pashto and relates to lush green farming area. In Persian language it translates to Sabzwār.

The population of Shindand District is around 49,024. The district center is the town of Shindand, which has an active market area. Shindand Air Base is located near the town. The Kandahar–Herat Highway passes through the district. The Zerkoh Valley is in the district.

History

The ancient name of Shindand was Esfezar as still an Iranian small city, more a village, close to the border of Afghanistan on the Iranian side. Notable historical sites in Shindand include Qala-Dokhtar and Qala Rustam-Zal.

Divisions
Shindand District is divided into five bigger districts, namely Zawol, Zerkoh, Poshteh-Koh, Kooh-Zoor and Qasaba. Shindand District is one of the most diverse and wide districts in Afghanistan, representing thirty different Afghan tribes which include both Pashtun and Tajik sub-tribes. Ismail Khan, the country's former Minister of Energy and Water, had support in the district, specially among his fellow Tajiks.

Demography 

The estimated population of Shindand District was 49,024 (as of April 2021). Another source has put at 173,800 (2011). In terms of tribal and ethnic groups, Shindand is one of the most diverse districts in Herat Province. Around 60 percent of the population is Pashtun and 40 percent Tajik, Aimaq Hazara, Baloch and others. However, sixty percent of Tajiks live within the town of Shindand, which includes Qasaba and surrounding districts. The main languages spoken in the district are Dari and Pashto.

Climate
Shindand is sunny and windy all year long. Though the winds pick up during the months of May through September, called Badayeh-Sado-Bist Roozeh (120 Day Winds). The rainy season is from November/December to March/April, though the rains are scattered.

References

External links
AIMS District Map
Shindand District in photos

Districts of Herat Province